History of America may refer to:
 The History of the United States
 The History of the Americas
 The European colonization of the Americas